Joseph Chang Hsiao-chuan (born 28 December 1983) is a Taiwanese actor. He is best known for his role in the critically acclaimed 2006 Taiwanese film Eternal Summer, which earned him two Golden Horse Awards nominations for Best Supporting Actor and Best New Performer for his role as Yu Shouheng. He was also nominated in 2006, for Best Actor in a Miniseries or Television Film at the 41st Golden Bell Awards for his role as Paul in Corner of Auction World. He attended the Fu-Hsin Trade and Arts School (復興商工) in Taipei.

Filmography

Film

Television series

Music video appearances

Awards and nominations

References

External links

Joseph Chang at chinesemov.com

1983 births
Living people
Taiwanese male film actors
Taiwanese male television actors
Taiwanese male stage actors
21st-century Taiwanese male actors